Knob or KNOB may refer to:

Objects 
 A round handle
 Doorknob
 Control knob, controls a device 
 Brodie knob, on a steering wheel
 Tow ball or hitch ball
 Dorset knob, a biscuit

Landforms 
 A rounded hill or mountain, particularly in the Appalachians and the Ozarks
 List of geographical knobs
 The Knob (disambiguation), several individual knobs with the name
 A knob is also a kame, which is a mound left behind by a glacier
 Knobs region, a geographic region of Kentucky, locally known as "The Knobs", consisting of hundreds of isolated hills

Radio stations
 KNOB (FM), a radio station (96.7 FM) licensed to Healdsburg, California, United States
 KSFN, a radio station (1510 AM) licensed to Piedmont, California, United States, which held the call sign KNOB from 1995 to 1997
 KJPG, a radio station (1050 AM) licensed to Frazier Park, California, United States, which held the call sign KNOB from 1988 to 1994
 KLAX-FM, a radio station (97.9 FM) licensed to Long Beach, California, United States, which held the call sign KNOB from 1949 to 1988

Other uses 
 KNOB (duo), Israeli musical singing and producing duo (Niv Cohen and Meital Patash-Cohen)
 Protrusions on the surface of red blood cells in malaria

See also
 Knobs into holes packing, in molecular biology